Eqtidaar, (foaled 4 May 2015) is an Irish-bred, British-trained Thoroughbred racehorse. He showed promise as two-year-old when he won a maiden race on his debut and then finished fourth in the Sirenia Stakes. In the following year he was beaten in the Pavilion Stakes and the Carnarvon Stakes before recording his biggest win in the Commonwealth Cup. In two subsequent races that year he ran poorly in the July Cup and the Haydock Sprint Cup.

Background
Eqtidaar is a bay horse bred in Ireland by his owner, Hamdan Al Maktoum's Shadwell Estate. The colt was sent into training with Michael Stoute at Newmarket, Suffolk.

He was sired by the Haydock Sprint Cup winner Invincible Spirit, who has produced many other major winners including Kingman, Charm Spirit, Mayson, Fleeting Spirit, Moonlight Cloud and Lawman. Eqtidaar's dam Madany won two of her eleven races and went on to produce the 2000 Guineas runner-up Massaat. She was a descendant of the French mare Greenback, who was the female-line ancestor of many good winners including Toulon.

Racing career

2017: two-year-old season
Eqtidaar made his racecourse debut in a maiden race over six furlongs at Nottingham Racecourse on 18 August and started the 6/4 favourite in an eight-runner field. Ridden by Jim Crowley he accelerated into a clear lead in the final furlong and won "readily" by two and a half lengths from Mountain Guard. Dane O'Neill took the ride three weeks later when the colt was stepped up in class to contest the Group 3 Sirenia Stakes on the synthetic Polytrack surface at Kempton Park Racecourse and came home fourth behind the favoured Invincible Army.

2018: three-year-old season
Eqtidaar began his second campaign in the Group 3 Pavilion Stakes over six furlongs at Ascot Racecourse on 2 May. With O'Neill in the saddle he took the lead a quarter of a mile from the finish but was overtaken by Invincible Army in the closing stages and beaten into second place. In the Listed Carnarvon Stakes at Newbury Racecourse 17 days later he was made second favourite but was never able to reach the leaders after a slow start and came home fourth behind Never Back Down.

Crowley took the ride on 22 June at Royal Ascot when the colt was stepped up to Group 1 class to contest the Commonwealth Cup and started at odds of 12/1 in a 22 runner field. The Phoenix Stakes winner Sioux Nation went off favourite ahead of Invincible Army, Equilateral and Sands of Mali while the other runners included Heartache (Flying Childers Stakes), Cardsharp (July Stakes), Actress (Ballyogan Stakes) and Unfortunately (Prix Morny). Most of the runners, including Eqtidaar, raced up the centre of the straight while a smaller group of six raced up the stands-side. After racing in mid-division Eqtidaar made progress in the last quarter mile, took the lead inside the final furlong and held on well in the closing stages to win by half a length from Sands of Mali. After the race Crowley said "I knew Eqtidaar had potential. He'd been working fantastic at home and I knew today he had a great chance." Michael Stoute commented "We've always liked this horse. It didn't go right for him in the Pavilion Stakes and he was on the wrong side of the track at Newbury last time. He's progressing nicely."

Three weeks after his win at Ascot, Eqtidaar was pitted against older sprinters for the first time in the July Cup at Newmarket Racecourse. Although he briefly looked likely to threaten the leaders he was unable to sustain his challenge and came home ninth behind U S Navy Flag. After a lengthy break the colt returned to the track in September for the Haydock Sprint Cup in which he was ridden by Danny Tudhope and started a 20/1 outsider. He never looked likely to win and finished eleventh of the twelve runners behind The Tin Man beaten eighteen lengths by the winner.

2019: four-year-old season
On his first and only appearance as a four-year-old Eqtidaar contested the King Richard III Stakes at Leicester Racecourse on 27 April  in which he came home fifth of the six runners behind Hey Gaman.

Stud career
Eqtidaar was retired from racing to become a breeding stallion at his owner's Nunnery Stud in Newmarket.

Pedigree

References

External links
 Career 1-2-3 Colour Chart – Eqtidaar

2015 racehorse births
Racehorses bred in Ireland
Racehorses trained in the United Kingdom
Thoroughbred family 3-c